The Type 054A (NATO/OSD Jiangkai II) is a class of guided-missile frigate from the People's Republic of China. It is a development of the Type 054 frigate; compared to its predecessor, the Type 054A has medium-range air defense capability in the form of Type 382 radar and vertically launched (VLS) HHQ-16 surface-to-air missiles.

The Type 054A entered service with the People's Liberation Army Navy (PLAN) in January 2008, and was a key component of the PLAN's surface fleet by the late 2010s. Production was ongoing in 2021.

Design

The development of the Type 054A may have been driven by China's need to address high-intensity armed conflict.

The Type 054A uses the same stealthy hull form as the Type 054. The forward launcher for HQ-7 short-range SAM is replaced with a 32-cell vertical launching system for medium-range HHQ-16 SAMs and Yu-8 antisubmarine rockets. The smaller main gun and Type 730 close-in weapon system (CIWS) are also installed.

The radar suite makes use of technology reverse engineered from Russian systems; the affected Chinese systems may include the H/LJQ-382 air search radar (from the Fregat MAE-3) and the H/LJQ-366 fire control radar (from the Mineral ME). The HHQ-16 target illuminators may also be derived from the Russian MR-90.

Ships starting with the 17th unit were constructed with enhanced anti-submarine warfare capability - adding variable depth and towed array sonar - and the Type 1130 CIWS instead of the Type 730. These ships have been unofficially referred to as Type 054A+, Type 054A2, or modified Jiangkai II.

In 2015, Gabe Collins estimated that each ship cost .

Operational history

Type 054As have regularly deployed beyond China's regional waters.

Ships have participated in anti-piracy naval patrols off of Somalia. The first was Huangshan, which deployed as part of China's second rotation in April 2019. From there, the ships have been detached to respond to regional crises. Frigates evacuated Chinese citizens from Libya in 2011 - making Xuzhou the first PLAN ship to enter the Mediterranean Sea - and Yemen in 2015. Another joined an international effort to secure Syria's chemical weapons in 2014.

Frigates also participated in the first Chinese naval exercises with the Russian Navy in the Mediterranean in 2015 and the Baltic Sea in 2017.

Exports

In January 2013, it was confirmed that China offered three Type 054As to the Royal Thai Navy for US$1 billion. Ultimately, Thailand selected a derivative of the South Korean  from Daewoo Shipbuilding & Marine Engineering.

The first entered service on 8 November 2021.

Ships of class

Gallery

See also
List of naval ship classes in service

References

Citations

Bibliography

External links

 Chinese Defense Today page
 Chinese Navy

 
Stealth ships